The  tentacled flathead (Papilloculiceps longiceps), also known as the Indian Ocean crocodilefish, Madagascar flathead or longhead flathead, is a species of marine ray-finned fish belonging to the family Platycephalidae, the flatheads. This species is in the western Indian Ocean, including the Red Sea and the Mediterranean, having invaded as a Lessepsian migrant through the Suez Canal. It is the only species in the monotypic genus Papilloculiceps.

Taxonomy
The tentacled flathead was first formally described as Platycephalus longiceps by the French zoologist Georges Cuvier in 1829 from specimens collected by Ehrenberg at Massawa in Eritrea. In 1873 the French zoologist Henri Émile Sauvage described a new species Platycephalus grandidieri from Madagascar and in 1956 the American zoologist Henry Weed Fowler and the Israeli ichthyologist Heinz Steinitz proposed a new monotypic genus,  Papilloculiceps, with Sauvage's Platycephalus grandidieri as its type species. P. grandidieri is now considered to be a junior synonym of Cuvier's P. longiceps. This genus is classified within the family Playtcephalidae, the flatheads which the 5th edition of Fishes of the World classifies within the suborder Platycephaloidei in the order Scorpaeniformes.

Etymology
The genus name Papilloculicepsis a combination of papilla, meaning "nipple", and oculus, which means "eye", a reference to the small and inconspicuous flattened papilla on the upper surface of the eyeball this species with ceps, which means "head" suffixed The specific name means "long head" and may refer to the head of this fish being similar to that of a crocodile's.

Description
The tentacled flathead has an elongate body with a depressed head with 5 prominent nuchal spines. The ridges on the preoperculum and operculum are smaller dorsally than they are ventrally. There is a spine on the rear of the suborbital ridge which ends with a small spine. There are small spines on the preoperculum. The supraorbital is smooth with a tiny terminal spine, there is one preocular and two parietal spines. The eyes have notable papillae on their upper surfaces. The first dorsal fin has 9 spines and the second dorsal fin and the anal fin each have 11 soft rays. The body is  mottled  brownish or greenish dorsally, whitish ventrally. There are 3 or 4 dark bands on the caudal fin and the other fins are marked with large, dark blotches.

Distribution and habitat
The tentacled flathead is found in the western Indian Ocean from northern KwaZulu-Natal and Madagascar to the northern Red Sea. A single record was reported in the Mediterranean Sea off Israel in 1986.

Biology
The tentacled flathead is a well camouflaged, ambush predator of fish and crustaceans.

Gallery

References

External links
 

Platycephalidae
Fish of the Red Sea
Monotypic fish genera
Fish described in 1829
Taxa named by Georges Cuvier